Zane Banton (born 23 May 1996) is an English semi-professional footballer who plays as a striker for  club St Albans City.

Career

Luton Town
Born in Stevenage, Hertfordshire, Banton became a first-year scholar at Luton Town in July 2012, having previously been at Watford. During his first year as a scholar, he scored 16 goals for the under-18 team as they finished third in the Youth Alliance South East Conference. The following season, Banton signed a professional contract on 19 September 2013 until May 2015. He made his first-team debut five days later aged 17 as an 85th-minute substitute for Andre Gray in a 4–0 win over Woking. His first start came on 30 November in a 0–0 draw with Staines Town in the FA Trophy first round, before being substituted in the 60th minute. Banton joined Conference South club Concord Rangers on a one-month loan on 5 March 2014. At the time, Luton manager John Still said he hoped Banton's loan spell would help to aid his development and "might push him on a little bit". He debuted two days later in a 3–2 win over Eastleigh and completed the loan spell with three appearances.

On 8 August 2014, Banton joined Southern League Premier Division club Biggleswade Town on a three-month loan. He made his debut a day later as a 69th-minute substitute in a 2–0 defeat to Chippenham Town. Banton scored his first goal for Biggleswade in a 4–1 win over Dorchester Town on 23 August. He added a second goal to his Biggleswade tally in a 1–0 win over Burnham on 9 September. Banton scored in three consecutive matches in all competitions from September to October and made his final appearance for Biggleswade in a 3–3 draw with Slough Town on 28 October. He finished the loan spell with six goals from 21 appearances. Banton was recalled from his loan at Biggleswade on 31 October, and joined Conference South club Hemel Hempstead Town later that day on loan until 29 November. He debuted in a 1–0 win over Bromley on 11 November. Banton made four further appearances in all competitions and scored the winning goal in a 2–1 win over Truro City in the FA Trophy third qualifying round on 29 November. He rejoined Hemel Hempstead Town on loan until the end of the season at the beginning of January 2015.

On 21 September 2015, Banton joined National League club Boreham Wood on a one-month loan. He debuted in a 2–1 win away to Torquay United and completed the loan spell with two appearances. Banton later rejoined Hemel Hempstead Town on a one-month youth loan until 9 January 2016, starting in a 2–1 defeat at home to Ebbsfleet United on 5 December. In the following match, Banton scored in a 7–4 defeat away to Eastbourne Borough in the FA Trophy on 12 December. Banton's loan was extended for a second month on 13 January 2016 until 14 February, with an immediate recall option. Luton exercised the option to recall Banton on 30 January with immediate effect to allow him to be named on the bench for the match at home to Notts County, which finished as a 2–0 defeat. Banton made his Football League debut as a 73rd-minute substitute for Jonathan Smith in a 2–0 defeat at home to Accrington Stanley on 9 April. This was followed up with three further substitute appearances, and finished 2015–16 with four appearances for Luton. Banton signed a new one-year contract after the end of the season, with the option of a one-year extension.

St Albans City
On 24 March 2017, Banton joined National League South club St Albans City on loan until the end of 2016–17. He debuted a day later in a 1–0 win at home to Dartford. Banton scored his first goal for St Albans on 15 April in a 1–1 draw with Whitehawk, and this was followed up with a goal in the following match, a 3–0 victory at home to Weston-super-Mare. He was recalled by Luton on 27 April, having scored twice in six appearances for St Albans. Banton was released by Luton when his contract expired at the end of 2016–17.

Banton joined St Albans permanently on a one-year contract on 2 June 2017. He signed a new contract for 2018–19 in May 2018.

Career statistics

Honours
Luton Town
Conference Premier: 2013–14

References

External links
Profile at the St Albans City F.C. website

1996 births
Living people
People from Stevenage
Footballers from Hertfordshire
English footballers
Association football forwards
Watford F.C. players
Luton Town F.C. players
Concord Rangers F.C. players
Biggleswade Town F.C. players
Hemel Hempstead Town F.C. players
Boreham Wood F.C. players
St Albans City F.C. players
National League (English football) players
English Football League players
Southern Football League players